Chloe Piene is a visual artist known primarily for her drawing. It has been described as “brutal, delicate, figurative, forensic, erotic and fantastic.” Chloe Piene was born in the United States and received her BA in Art History at Columbia University and her MFA in Fine Art from Goldsmiths, University of London.

Work
Piene is known widely for her delicate and penetrating drawings, which are typically anchored in the body. Her video and sculpture utilize the greater sensory impact of noise, time, shadow, and heavy materials to dig visibly into the more subterranean levels of experience. In her sculptures, Piene has worked primarily with iron, steel, porcelain, and installation. Her work has made various and diverse associations with prisoners, love letters, failure, history and heroic transformation.

In 2016, Piene performed her work Familienaufstellung in Vienna, Austria. Translated as “Family Constellation,” Familienaufstellung was developed in the 1990s as a form of therapy by German psychotherapist Bert Hellingerd. Piene invited artists, actors, and friends to play the parts of her real family members, including the artist Matthew Barney as her brother, and actress Petra Morse of the Burgtheater in Vienna as her mother. Piene's earlier performance To Serve was a collaborative dialogue with a United States Special Operations Commander in New York, tandem to her three-part video series which worked directly with cameras strapped to the heads of soldiers stationed in Afghanistan.

Exhibitions (selected)
Exhibiting internationally, Piene's shows include: Selections from The Guerlain Collection at the Centre Pompidou and the Albertina, Vienna, 2019; Reloaded, in which Piene paired with Egon Schiele as part of his Centennial at the Leopold Museum, Vienna, 2018; HB + CP - Hans Bellmer and Chloe Piene at Galerie Nathalie Obadia, Paris, 2008; Bodies of Desire: Works on paper by Willem de Kooning and Chloe Piene at the Locks Gallery, Philadelphia, 2007; and the 2004 Whitney Biennial.

Public collections (selected)
Her work is part of national and state collections worldwide including the following:

Herbert F. Johnson Museum of Art, Ithaca, New York
High Museum of Art, Atlanta
Minneapolis Institute of Art 
Museum of Contemporary Art, Los Angeles
Museum of Modern Art, New York
San Francisco Museum of Modern Art, San Francisco
Walker Art Center, Minneapolis
Whitney Museum of American Art, New York
Burger Collection, Berlin
Centre national d'art et de culture George Pompidou, Paris
Deutsche Bank, Berlin
Fondation d'art contemporain Daniel et Florence Guerlain, Paris
FNAC, France
FRAC, France
Kupfertisch Kabinett, Berlin
Sammlung Bayer, Berlin
Sammlung Hoffman, Berlin

Publications (selected)
Her work has been reviewed by The New York Times, Frieze, Le Figaro, Los Angeles Times, BOMB Magazine, The Philadelphia Inquirer, the Frankfurter Allgemeine Zeitung, the Süddeutsche Zeitung, the Berliner Zeitung, among others. Books include Vitamin D, Phaidon; Drawing People, The Hayward Gallery, London; Les Maitres du Desordre The Musée Quai Branly, Paris; A Passion For Drawing, Selection From The Guerlain Collection and Drawing Now, The Albertina Museum, Vienna.

Bibliography (selected)

References

External links
 Chloe Piene Official Site
 "Grand flourishes of paint" by Christopher Knight, The Los Angeles Times, May 2015 via pressreader.com
 A Passion For Drawing: Selections from the Guerlain Collection at The Pompidou, The Albertina Vienna 
 Fragmented Fetishes: Monstrosity and Desire In Women's Contemporary Time-Based Art by Jenny Keane
 In bester Gesellschaft Ausgewählte Erwerbungen des Berliner Kupferstichkabinetts
Exhibition // Chloe Piene at Galerie Barbara Thumm
List of Whitney Biennial artists#2004
Chloe Piene on MoMa.org
Chloe Piene on Le Centre Pompidou

American contemporary artists
American printmakers
1972 births
Living people